Rene Farrait Nieves (born November 2, 1967) is a Puerto Rican singer, actor, and former member of the boy band Menudo.

After leaving the band, Farrait enjoyed a brief solo career.

In the 80's, Rene Farrait reunited with former Menudo bandmates  Xavier Serbia, Ray Reyes and Johnny Lozada (Reyes and Farrait were not Menudo members at the same time) and formed a trio called Proyecto M. (Reyes substituted Serbia as a member of Proyecto M).

In 1998, Farrait joined five other former band members (including Reyes and Lozada) for a comeback tour named El Reencuentro.

Following El Reencuentro's break up in 2015, Farrait, along with Reyes and fellow former Menudo members Miguel Cancel, Charlie Masso (who had substituted Farrait as member of the original Menudo) and Robert Avellanet returned to touring, this time being allowed to use the name Menudo again but using the name Menudomania Forever.

Acting
Farrait participated in a film named Menudo: La Pelicula along with his Menudo bandmates in 1981. When Una Aventura Llamada Menudo was recorded in 1982, Farrait had already left the band; substituted by Charlie Masso; nevertheless, he appeared on the background during parts of the film as one of the film's main secondary characters, "Senora Mia", greatly enjoyed the band's last album with Rene on it and had a poster of Rene and his Menudo band-mates in her room.

In 2017, Farrait retook his film career, playing a priest on the Peruvian film La paisana Jacinta en búsqueda de Wasaberto.

Personal life
Farrait was married to Carol Maldonado,  and later got divorced. He has three daughters and is currently single.

In pop culture
Farrait is played by Alejandro Bermudez in the 2020 Amazon Prime Video series based on Menudo, "Subete A Mi Moto".

Discography

With Menudo 
 Chiquitita (1979)
 Felicidades (1979)
 Mas Mucho Mas (1980)
 Es Navidad (1980)
 Fuego (1981)
 Xanadu (1981)
 Quiero Ser (1981)

With Proyecto M 
 Proyecto M (1987)
 Proyecto M 2 (1989)
 Arde que me quemas (1991)
 Si esta no Conmigo (1993)

See also

List of Puerto Ricans

References

1967 births
Living people
Menudo (band) members
People from San Juan, Puerto Rico
20th-century Puerto Rican male singers
Puerto Rican people of French descent
People from Bayamón, Puerto Rico